is a Shingon Buddhist temple in Tokyo's Bunkyō.

History
This Buddhist temple was established by the fifth shōgun Tokugawa Tsunayoshi, who dedicated it to his mother. It is notable for surviving the American air raids during World War II, whereas most other historical sites in Tokyo were turned into rubble.

Notable interments
Like many Buddhist temples in Japan, Gokoku-ji has a cemetery on its premises. Among those interred are the remains of the following people.
 Sanjō Sanetomi (1837–1891), the last Daijō Daijin.
 Yamada Akiyoshi (1844–1892), Minister of Industry (1879–1880), Home Minister (1881–1883)  and Minister of Justice (1883–1891) and Lieutenant General in the Imperial Japanese Army, and the founder of Nihon Law School (current Nihon University) and Kokugakuin (current Kokugakuin University).
 Josiah Conder (1852–1920), a British architect and oyatoi gaikokujin.
 Ōkuma Shigenobu (1838–1922), the 8th (1898) and 17th (1914–1916) Prime Minister of Japan.
 Yamagata Aritomo (1838–1922), Field Marshal in the Imperial Japanese Army and the 3rd (1889–1891) and 9th (1898–1900) Prime Minister of Japan.
 Ōkura Kihachirō (1837–1928), an entrepreneur.
 Dan Takuma (1858–1932), a former Director-General of Mitsui (Mitsui Group).
 Seiji Noma (1878–1938), the founder of Kodansha.
 Masuda Takashi (1848–1938), the founder of Mitsui & Co. (Mitsui Bussan) and Chugai-Bukka-Sinpo (current Nihon Keizai Shimbun), and also known as a tea master.
 Ikeda Shigeaki (1867–1950), a politician and former governor of the Bank of Japan.
 Nakamura Tempū (1876–1968), a martial artist and preacher of yoga to Japan.
 Ōyama Masutatsu (1923–1994), a karate master and the founder of Kyokushin kaikan.
 Dan Ikuma (1924–2001), a composer. A grandson of Dan Takuma.
 Hamuro Mitsuko, concubine of Emperor Meiji
 Hashimoto Natsuko, concubine of Emperor Meiji

See also 
 For an explanation of terms concerning Japanese Buddhism, Japanese Buddhist art, and Japanese Buddhist temple architecture, see the Glossary of Japanese Buddhism.

Notes

References
 Titsingh, Isaac. (1834). Annales des empereurs du Japon.  Paris: Oriental Translation Fund of Great Britain and Ireland. ; see also  Imprimerie Royale de France,

External links

  – 
 

Buddhist temples in Tokyo
Buildings and structures in Bunkyō
Shingon Buddhism